Dagestan, you holy fatherland was the regional anthem of the Russian federal subject of Dagestan from 2003 to 2016. It was composed and written by Shirvani Chalaev.

History
It was adopted in 2003 and relinquished in 2016. A new Dagestani regional anthem was adopted on 25 February 2016. It is now the organizational anthem of the Russian Armed Forces and the Russian police in Dagestan.

Lyrics

Russian original

References

Culture of Dagestan
Russian military songs